Atlantic is the debut album by Italian post-hardcore band Dufresne. It was released October 13, 2006.

Track listing

Credits 
 Nicola "Dominik" Cerantola - lead vocals
 Matteo "Ciube" Tabacco - bass, backup vocals
 Luca Dal Lago - guitar
 Alessandro Costa - keyboards
 Davide Zenorini - drums

References 

V2 Records albums
2006 debut albums
Dufresne (band) albums
Italian-language albums